Sinéad Bradley (born 17 February 1972) is a Social Democratic and Labour Party (SDLP) politician from Northern Ireland. She was an MLA for South Down from the 2016 election, but did not contest the 2022 election. She was the SDLP spokesperson on Economy and Health.

Background
She was born in the Burren, County Down to former MLA P. J. Bradley and his wife Leontia. Sinéad was the campaign manager for her father's successful 1998 Assembly election campaign.

She attended Ballyholland Primary School and St. Mary's High School, Newry. She then went to Manchester Metropolitan University from which she obtained a BSc(Hons) in Business studies and IT. She qualified as a teacher in 1996.

Bradley married John Challinor in 2000. The couple have a son.

References

1972 births
Living people
Place of birth missing (living people)
Social Democratic and Labour Party MLAs
Northern Ireland MLAs 2016–2017
Northern Ireland MLAs 2017–2022
Female members of the Northern Ireland Assembly
Alumni of Manchester Metropolitan University